Inherit the Wind  is an American play by Jerome Lawrence and Robert E. Lee, which debuted in 1955. The story fictionalizes the 1925 Scopes "Monkey" Trial as a means to discuss the then-contemporary McCarthy trials.

Background

Inherit the Wind is a fictionalized account of the 1925 Scopes "Monkey" Trial, which resulted in John T. Scopes' conviction for teaching Charles Darwin's theory of evolution to a high school science class, contrary to a Tennessee state law. The role of Matthew Harrison Brady is intended to reflect the personality and beliefs of William Jennings Bryan, while that of Henry Drummond is intended to be similar to that of Clarence Darrow. Bryan and Darrow, formerly close friends, opposed one another at the Scopes trial. The character of E. K. Hornbeck is modeled on that of H. L. Mencken, who covered the trial for The Baltimore Sun, and the character of Bertram Cates corresponds to Scopes. However, the playwrights state in a note at the opening of the play that it is not meant to be a historical account, and there are numerous instances where events were substantially altered or invented. For instance, the characters of the preacher and his daughter were fictional, the townspeople were not hostile towards those who had come to Dayton for the trial, and Bryan offered to pay Scopes' fine if he was convicted. Bryan did die shortly after the trial, but this occurred five days later, in his sleep. 

Political commentator Steve Benen said of the play's inaccuracies: "Scopes issued no plea for empathy, there was no fiancee and the real Scopes was never arrested. In fact, the popular film that was nominated for four Academy Awards and has helped shape the American understanding of the 'Scopes Monkey Trial' for decades is an inadequate reflection of history." Lawrence explained in a 1996 interview that the drama's purpose was to criticize the then-current state of McCarthyism. The play was also intended to defend intellectual freedom. According to Lawrence, "we used the teaching of evolution as a parable, a metaphor for any kind of mind control [...] It's not about science versus religion. It's about the right to think."

Title
The play's title comes from Proverbs 11:29, which in the King James Bible reads:

He that troubleth his own house shall inherit the wind: and the fool shall be servant to the wise of heart.

In Act Two, Scene One, Brady admonishes Reverend Brown with this Bible quote for alienating his daughter when he gives a fiery sermon against Cates.

Cast of characters
Matthew Harrison Brady, a three-time presidential candidate and nationally known attorney. He is a Populist and still a dynamic public speaker, even though he is in his late 60s or early 70s.
Henry Drummond, another nationally known attorney who was once Brady's closest friend and political confidant. He is about the same age as Brady.
Bertram "Bert" Cates, a Hillsboro high school teacher in his 20s who has taught the theory of evolution in violation of a state law banning its teaching in classrooms.
E. K. Hornbeck, a reporter for the fictional Baltimore Herald newspaper. He is young, sarcastic, cynical, and deeply opposed to religious belief.
Rachel Brown, the Rev. Brown's daughter. She is 22 and the romantic interest of Bertram Cates. Her loyalties are torn between her father and Cates, and she is easily manipulated by others.
Reverend Jeremiah Brown, a fundamentalist Protestant Christian preacher of unknown denomination who believes in Biblical literalism. He is widowed, and Rachel's father.
The Judge, a local judge who is subtly sympathetic to Rev. Brown's views.
Howard Blair, a 13-year-old high school student who was in Bertram Cates' class.
Melinda Loomis, a 12-year-old girl who believes strongly in the Bible.
Tom Davenport, the local district attorney who prosecutes Bertram Cates.
The Mayor, the top elected official of Hillsboro who is openly supportive of the Rev. Brown but also deeply political and concerned about the economic future of his town.

There are also a number of minor speaking roles. These include Meeker, a bailiff at the Hillsboro courthouse; Mrs. Sarah Brady, Matthew Harrison Brady's wife; Mrs. Krebs, a loudly outspoken supporter of Rev. Brown and leader of the Ladies' Aid Society; Mr. Bannister, a local citizen; Elijah, an illiterate man from the nearby woods who sells Bibles to the crowd; Harry Esterbrook, a radio reporter from Chicago; Jesse Dunlap, a local farmer; George Sillers, an employee at the feed store; and the Storekeeper, Sillers' employer.

Summary
The play takes place in the small town of Hillsboro, in an unnamed state in the central part of the United States.  (It is often assumed to be either Kentucky or Tennessee.)  Scenes take place either in front of the county courthouse or in the courtroom.  It takes place in the summertime "not too long ago".

Act One

Scene One
The play begins with local high school student Howard Blair looking for worms in front of the Hillsboro courthouse. Melinda appears, and they have a discussion about evolution which helps inform the audience about the claims of evolution. They exit when Rachel enters.  Rachel convinces Meeker, the bailiff, to bring Bertram Cates out of his prison cell so that Rachel and Bert can talk.  Meeker does so.  Bert and Rachel's conversation tells the audience about why Bert taught evolution to his students. Rachel and Bert are in love, and hug. Meeker comes in as they are hugging, saying he needs to sweep. Rachel exits. Meeker tells Bert that Matthew Harrison Brady is coming to town to help prosecute the case.  Meeker talks about a time when he was a young man, and saw Mathew Harrison Brady during one of his failed presidential campaigns.  Bert's lawyer is not revealed, but Bert says his attorney is being provided by the Baltimore Herald.  Bert and Meeker exit.

Reverend Jeremiah Brown enters and speaks with the townpeople, Howard, and Melinda.  Everyone is excited that Matthew Harrison Brady is coming to Hillsboro. When Timmy, a boy who lives in Hillsboro, sees the smoke from the arriving train, everyone exits.  E. K. Hornbeck, a reporter for the Baltimore Herald, enters and in a soliloquy cruelly ridicules the people of Hillsboro.  Hornbeck spots a monkey that someone has brought to town, and feigns conversation with it.  The crowd enters with Matthew Harrison Brady, Mrs. Brady, Rev. Brown, and the Mayor.  Brady makes a brief speech, which the crowd wildly cheers.  The Mayor also makes a short speech, and makes Brady an "Honorary Colonel in the State Militia". The Mayor introduces Brady to Reverend Brown. Members of the Ladies' Aid Society set up a table and a buffet lunch on the courthouse lawn as Brady talks about how he will fight Cates' legal counsel. Hornbeck then announces that the defense attorney will be Henry Drummond, one of Brady's old friends and a well-known lawyer.  The scene ends with everyone in the town escorting the Bradys to a nearby hotel and the introduction of Drummond, who is regarded as the devil.

Scene Two
Scene Two occurs in the courtroom. Present are Matthew Harrison Brady, Henry Drummond, Tom Davenport, the Mayor, the Judge, and many townspeople (sitting behind the defense and prosecution and watching the proceedings). It is a day or two later, and jury selection is under way. Davenport, the local district attorney, questions Mr. Bannister to see if he is an acceptable juror to the prosecution. Bannister says he attends church on Sundays, and the prosecution accepts him. Drummond questions Bannister, and it is revealed that Bannister is illiterate. Drummond accepts Bannister for the jury. Jesse Dunlap is then called to the stand.  Brady asks Dunlap if he believes in the Bible. Dunlap states "I believe in the Holy Word of God. And I believe in Matthew Harrison Brady!" Brady finds Dunlap acceptable. Drummond refuses to question Dunlap, and says Dunlap is not acceptable as a juror. Brady demands that Drummond provide a reason for refusing Dunlap, or at least ask him a question. Drummond asks Dunlap how he feels, then excuses Dunlap as unacceptable.

Drummond protests the use of the title "Colonel" by Matthew Harrison Brady and the Judge. Realizing that Brady's honorary title may have prejudiced the judicial proceedings, the Mayor confers with the Judge and they agree to make Drummond a "Temporary Honorary Colonel".

George Sillers is called as a potential juror. Brady briefly questions Sillers, then accepts him. Drummond asks Sillers some questions on religion and then evolution, then accepts Sillers as well. Alarmed, Brady tells the court that Sillers won't render impartial judgment. Drummond objects to Brady's use of the word "conform". Brady tells the Judge (although his comments are subtly directed at Drummond) about the "Endicott Publishing Case", a trial in which Brady claims Drummond confused the jury so much that they delivered an incorrect verdict. Drummond states that all he wants to do is stop "the clock-stoppers" from inserting religious belief into the Constitution.  The Judge reminds Drummond that this is not a federal case, and that constitutional questions cannot be entertained. Drummond demands that they be included, but the Judge rules him out of order. The Judge also rules that the jury has been selected and court is finished for the day.

After recessing the court, the Judge announces that Reverend Brown will hold a prayer meeting later that night. Drummond says that such announcements from the bench are prejudicial, but the Judge says the court has recessed.

Act Two

Scene One
Scene One occurs in front of the courthouse later that evening.  Two workmen discuss whether to take down the "Read Your Bible" banner which hangs over the entrance to the courthouse, and decide not to. They leave when they hear people approaching.

Brady enters with Hornbeck and some reporters from "Reuters News Agency", and discusses his past close relationship with Drummond. Brady accuses Hornbeck of biased reporting, but Hornbeck replies that he is a critic—not a reporter.

Reverend Brown and a crowd of supporters (including Drummond) enter for the prayer meeting. Brown engages in call and response with the crowd, preaching about how God created the world in six days. Brown condemns Cates, and Rachel (who has entered mid-sermon) demands that he stop. Instead, Rev. Brown condemns anyone who seeks forgiveness for Cates. Rachel becomes very distressed. Brady, increasingly uneasy with the tenor of Brown's sermon, interrupts him and quotes the Book of Proverbs: "He that troubleth his own house shall inherit the wind..." Brady dismisses the crowd by reminding them of Jesus Christ's command to forgive.

After the prayer meeting, Brady approaches Drummond (who was in the crowd) and asks him why he is defending Cates. He accuses Drummond of having "moved away" from everything both men once believed in. Drummond replies, "All motion is relative. Perhaps it is you who have moved away by standing still."

Scene Two
Scene Two occurs in the courtroom two days after the prayer meeting.  It is afternoon, and very hot.  The scene opens with the trial already under way. Brady examines witness Howard Blair. Afterward, Brady and Drummond exchange heated words about speech-making during the trial. Drummond attempts to cross-examine Howard, but Brady repeatedly objects to Drummond's questions (which the Judge sustains). Drummond presents a monologue in which he declares morality is meaningless but truth is valuable, then dismisses Howard from the stand.

Davenport calls Rachel as a witness. Under Brady's questioning, she reveals that Cates stopped attending Rev. Brown's church after Brown preached that a local boy who had drowned was not saved because he had not been baptized. Cates angrily shouts that Brown had really preached that the boy was burning in hell. The crowd shouts Cates down, but Cates continues until order is restored. Brady again questions Rachel, demanding to know if Cates denied the reality of God and compared marriage to the breeding of animals. Cates again interrupts her response, yelling that his statements to her were private and just questions—not statements of fact. Rachel weeps on the stand, and Drummond objects to the line of questioning. Brady ends his examination, and Drummond allows Rachel to step down without cross-examination.

Drummond attempts to call scientists as witnesses for the defense, but the Judge denies his request. Drummond asks if the judge will permit testimony about the Bible, and the judge does. Drummond calls Brady to the stand as an expert on the Bible.

Drummond attempts to question Brady about his knowledge of the writings of Charles Darwin, but the Judge rules these questions out of order. Drummond then asks Brady about the truthfulness behind the story of Jonah and the whale and other accounts. Brady states they are all true, and Drummond accuses him of wanting to throw all modern science out of the classroom.  Davenport objects to Drummond's line of questioning, but Brady declares that Drummond is only playing into his hands.  Drummond submits that science has forced the human race to abandon its faith in a literal interpretation of the Bible. God gave man the ability to reason, so why can't he use that ability to question the Bible, Drummond asks. He also asks Brady if the ability to think is what distinguishes a man from a sponge.  Brady responds that God determines who shall be a man and who shall be a sponge. Drummond declares that Cates only demands the same rights as a sponge: To think.  The crowd in the courtroom erupts in applause.

Drummond changes his line of questioning. He asks Brady how old the earth is, and Brady replies it is about 6,000 years old. But if local rocks and fossils are millions of years old, Drummond asks, how can this be?  Unnerved, Brady reasserts that the world was created in six days, as the Bible says. Drummond asks Brady if it isn't possible that, since the sun was not created until the fourth day, that the first "day" of creation wasn't in fact millions of years in length. Realizing that science and religion might be compatible after all, the crowd becomes vocally restive.

Brady responds by accusing Drummond of trying to destroy people's faith, and that God spoke directly to the authors of the Bible. Drummond asks him how Brady knows that God did not speak to Charles Darwin. Brady asserts that God told him that Darwin's works were not divinely inspired. Drummond mocks Brady as a "modern apostle" and concludes that no law can be just if its interpretation relies on the divine inspiration given to just one man, Matthew Harrison Brady.  Brady is further unnerved, and declares that all men have free will.  Drummond seizes on his statement, and demands to know why the law refuses to allow Bertram Cates to exercise his free will.  Brady begins quoting the Bible at length, and Drummond continues to mock him.  The crowd laughs at Brady.  Drummond dismisses him from the witness stand, and Brady slumps in the witness chair while his wife rushes to his side and comforts him.

Act Three
The time is the day after the Brady/Drummond confrontation.  It is early morning, and still very hot.  Act Three consists of a single scene, and all the major characters are present. The courtroom is jammed with people, including several radio reporters and their bulky equipment. Cates asks Drummond if he will be found guilty. Drummond responds that when he was seven years old, he received a rocking horse named Golden Dancer as a gift. But it broke when he rode it the first time. Drummond advises him that appearances can be deceiving, and a clear-cut guilty verdict may conceal many things. He also implicitly criticizes Brady as all show and no substance.  Their discussion ends.  Before the trial begins, the Mayor speaks privately with the Judge in front of the bench. The mass media have been making the town look bad, and the Mayor asks the Judge to go easy on Cates should there be a guilty verdict.

The Judge opens the trial, and the jury enters. Cates is given permission to speak before sentencing occurs, and says the law is unjust. But his assertion is not a strong one, and he sits down without completing his statement. The Judge takes the verdict from the jury, and declares Cates guilty. He sentences Cates to a $100 fine.  Many in the crowd are angry at the verdict, but others are pleased.  Brady denounces the sentence as too lenient. Drummond says Cates will pay no fine and will appeal. Outraged, Brady asks permission to speak to the crowd. But the Judge declares the proceedings over and the court adjourned. The Judge exits.

In the chaos that ensues after the adjournment, Brady begins to deliver his speech and struggles to be heard. The crowd begins to leave, and the radio people turn off the microphones. Brady shouts even louder, trying to get the crowd's attention.  Suddenly he collapses, and is carried out of the courtroom in a delirium. Hornbeck sneers at Brady and calls him a political loser. Cates asks Drummond if he won or lost, and Drummond says he won by bringing national attention to a bad law. Hornbeck says his newspaper will pay Cates' bail to keep him out of jail.

Rachel enters, and tells Cates that she moved out of her father's house. She tells Cates that she tried to read some of Darwin's book, which she shows to him, but didn't understand it. She apologizes to Drummond and says she was afraid of thinking because thinking could lead to bad thoughts.

The Judge enters and announces that Matthew Harrison Brady has just died. Drummond is deeply saddened. Hornbeck criticizes Brady at length, sarcastically saying that he died of "a busted belly", but Drummond says Hornbeck is being unfairly critical of religious belief.  They argue about Brady's achievements.  Hornbeck accuses Drummond of being overly sentimental, and leaves.

Cates and Rachel depart to catch a train; they are leaving town to be married elsewhere. Rachel leaves behind Cates's copy of Darwin's The Descent of Man. Drummond picks up both the Darwin book and a Bible, and leaves the courtroom with both books in his briefcase.

Original production and revivals
Lawrence and Lee’s play was rejected by eight Broadway producers before coming to the attention of Margot Jones, a theater director and producer in Dallas, Texas. With Jones directing, Inherit the Wind premiered in Dallas on January 10, 1955, and received rave reviews. The Broadway rights were soon acquired by Herman Shumlin, and the play opened at Broadway’s National Theatre on April 21, 1955. Shumlin directed, with actors Paul Muni, Ed Begley and Tony Randall in the cast. It played on Broadway until June 22, 1957, where it closed after 806 performances. It was revived on Broadway twice: April 4 – May 12, 1996 and April 12 – July 8, 2007. The 1996 revival starred George C. Scott (who played Brady in the later 1999 film version) as Drummond and Charles Durning as Brady. In April, Scott had to leave the show mid-performance due to ill health and was replaced by the show's producer, Tony Randall, for that day. Randall played the Wednesday matinees for Scott from that point on. His illness finally led to the revival's closure. Christopher Plummer and Brian Dennehy starred in the 2007 revival.

Other revivals
In the 1990s Jason Miller and Malachy McCourt starred in a Philadelphia production that broke that city's long run records.

In 2006 several scenes were translated to Italian for the first time by Luca Giberti for a series of Darwin-themed readings.

Kevin Spacey (Henry Drummond) and David Troughton (Matthew Harrison Brady) starred in a 2009 revival at The Old Vic in London.

In 2018, Chandan Sen directed the play for the first time in the Bengali language, renamed as A-Pabitra which starred actor Sabyasachi Chakraborty along with Asit Basu, Tandra Basu, Shantilal Mukherjee and Sen himself.

Screen adaptations
 Inherit the Wind (1960 film), directed by Stanley Kramer; starring Spencer Tracy, Fredric March, and Gene Kelly
 Inherit the Wind (1965 film), a television film starring Melvyn Douglas, Ed Begley and Murray Hamilton
 Inherit the Wind (1988 film), a television film starring Jason Robards, Kirk Douglas, and Darren McGavin
 Inherit the Wind (1999 film), a television film starring Jack Lemmon, George C. Scott, and Beau Bridges

See also 

 List of American films of 1960
 Trial movies

References

Further reading
Larson, Edward. Summer for the Gods:  The Scopes Trial and America's Continuing Debate over Science and Religion. 2d ed. New York:  Basic Books, 2006.

External links

Selected Plays of Jerome Lawrence and Robert E. Lee - free online book that includes the script of Inherit the Wind
 Inherit the Wind at the Internet Broadway Database

1955 plays
Broadway plays
Courtroom drama plays
1950s legal films
Plays about McCarthyism
Plays about religion and science
American plays adapted into films
Plays based on actual events
Plays by Robert E. Lee (playwright)
Plays set in the United States
Scopes Trial
Cultural depictions of Clarence Darrow
Cultural depictions of John T. Scopes